Le jour S... is a 1984 Canadian drama film directed by Jean Pierre Lefebvre. It was screened in the Un Certain Regard section at the 1984 Cannes Film Festival. Jean-Baptiste (Pierre Curzi), a restless Québécois in his late 30s, spends the day alone in Montreal while his current partner (Marie Tifo) is pursuing a career in Toronto. Every woman he encounters reminds him of her. He relives his past through actual encounters as well as his imaginative memory.

The film was a sequel to Lefebvre's 1968 film Patricia and Jean-Baptiste (Patricia et Jean-Baptiste).

The film was included in Jean Pierre Lefebvre: Vidéaste, a retrospective program of Lefebvre's films at the 2001 Toronto International Film Festival.

Cast
 Pierre Curzi - Jean-Baptiste Beauregard
 Michel Daigle
 Violaine Estérez - The little girl
 Marcel Sabourin
 Marie Tifo - The women

References

External links

1984 films
Canadian drama films
1984 drama films
Films directed by Jean Pierre Lefebvre
Films shot in Montreal
Canadian sequel films
French-language Canadian films
1980s Canadian films